There are a number of government agencies and administrative divisions with the title of Southern Department. 

 Southern Department (United Kingdom)
 Southern Department (United States), see Departments of the Continental Army, or Department (United States Army)
 Southern Department of British North America (1755–1783), see Indian Department#Indian Department for British North America 1755–1867

See also
 Sud (department), Haiti